The EFL Golden Glove, formerly Football League Golden Glove, is an annual association football award, given to the goalkeeper who has kept the most clean sheets in each of the three EFL divisions. Originally, clean sheets in the league (Championship, League One and League Two), EFL Cup, EFL Trophy and FA Cup all counted towards the Golden Glove but, since 2018, only non-playoff league fixtures qualify.

The award was first given after the 2006–07 season, with sponsorship from Puma. Macron, the official kits and ball supplier of the Football League, later sponsored the award. In the 2010–11 season no Golden Glove award was given. The 2011–12 season saw the introduction of a monthly award in addition to an annual award under new sponsors Precision Training. In 2018, the EFL and sponsors Sky Bet announced the return of the award.

Winners

Seasonal awards

2011–12 monthly awards 

In addition to the annual award, the 2011–12 season saw the introduction of a monthly award, given to the best performing goalkeeper in the Football League across all three divisions. The monthly award was also known as the "Precision Goalkeeping Golden Glove Award". The monthly goalkeeping awards were scrapped after one season.

Winners 

Source:

References

English football trophies and awards
English Football League trophies and awards
Association football goalkeeper awards